Timbrels and Torahs is a 2000 documentary film written, produced and directed by Judith Montell and Miriam Chaya. The film explains a new Jewish ritual designed to celebrate women on their 60th birthday.

References

American documentary films
Documentary films about Jews and Judaism in the United States
Documentary films about feminism
Jewish feminism
2000 films
2000 documentary films
Documentary films about old age
2000s English-language films
2000s American films